William Hamilton (died January 9, 1878) was a Michigan politician that was the ninth and eighteenth mayor of the city of Flint, Michigan serving from 1863 to 1865 and 1876 to 1877.

Political life
At the first Flint City elections in 1855, Hamilton was selected as Second Ward Assessor.  From 1861 to 1863 for 2 terms, he was City Council Alderman from the 2nd ward. He was elected as the eighth mayor of the City of Flint in 1863 and again in 1864 serving two one-year term.  He was later elected to the office again in 1876.

Post-political life
His daughter, Lizzie, died from consumption on January 9, 1878.

References

Year of birth missing
1878 deaths
Mayors of Flint, Michigan
19th-century American politicians